Didukh is a Ukrainian surname. Notable people with the surname include:

 Oleksandr Didukh (born 1982), Ukrainian table tennis player
 Viktor Didukh (born 1987), Ukrainian para table tennis player

See also
 

Ukrainian-language surnames